The Lowell Ranger Station compound is in the Coronado National Forest of southern Arizona. It is located in Pima County, near Tucson.

History
The ranger station buildings were built in 1934 by the Civilian Conservation Corps.  It was designed by USDA Forest Service.

National Register of Historic Places listing
It was listed on the National Register of Historic Places in 1993 for its architecture, which includes Pueblo Revival and other styles.

They were built by the CCC – Civilian Conservation Corps.

It was deemed significant "for its association with the expansion of Forest Service administration from custodial superintendence to active resource management" as well as for embodying "the use of standard plan architecture developed in the 1930s by Regional Office architects" and representing "a distinctive Forest Service architectural design style and philosophy."  It was part of the Depression-Era USDA Forest Service Administrative Complexes in Arizona MPS (Multiple Property Submission) of the National Park Service in 1989.

See also

 National Register of Historic Places listings in Pima County, Arizona
 Canelo Ranger Station
 CCC – Civilian Conservation Corps projects in Arizona

References

External links 

United States Forest Service ranger stations
Coronado National Forest
Buildings and structures in Pima County, Arizona
Government buildings in Arizona
Government buildings completed in 1934
National Register of Historic Places in Pima County, Arizona
Park buildings and structures on the National Register of Historic Places in Arizona
Civilian Conservation Corps in Arizona
Pueblo Revival architecture in Arizona
1934 establishments in Arizona